Paddy Turner  was an Irish football player during the 1960s and 1970s.

Turner was a forward who played for Shamrock Rovers, Shelbourne, Morton, Celtic, Glentoran, Dundalk and Bohemians. On the international front he won two full caps for the Republic of Ireland national football team, his first cap coming in a 1–0 home win for Ireland over Scotland on 9 June 1963.

He won a League of Ireland winners medal with Shamrock Rovers in 1958/59 and made 2 appearances in European competition for Rovers before signing for Shels in August 1960.

Paddy Turner signed for Celtic from Morton in May 1963. The former Shelbourne and Shamrock Rovers inside right was a cultured player and seemed to have settled well in Scotland producing some fine displays for the Cappielow club. However his debut in the Hoops was one to forget as the Bhoys lost 3-0 to Rangers at Parkhead in a League Cup tie on 8 August. Unfortunately for Turner his arrival at Parkhead coincided with the emergence of Bobby Murdoch and despite being more than a fair player himself Paddy was always going to be second choice behind the wonderful talent of Murdoch. Consequently, after little more than one year and 14 games Paddy headed back across the Irish Sea to play for Glentoran.

While at The Oval (Belfast) he scored against Panathinaikos in the 1964–65 European Cup.

In November 1972, he signed for Bohs from Dundalk on a free transfer. He made 17 league appearances in Bohs colours scoring 5 goals before he left the club at the end of the 1972/73 season. He also netted the first goal in Bohemians 3–1 win over Shamrock Rovers in the 1973 Leinster Senior Cup Final.

His step-brother John Delamere was also a footballer. His grandson, Callum Elder, also became a footballer.

Honours
 League of Ireland: 2
 Shamrock Rovers 1958/59
 Dundalk F.C. 1966/67
  Leinster Senior Cup: 1
 Bohemians 1973

References

League of Ireland players
League of Ireland XI players
Shamrock Rovers F.C. players
Bohemian F.C. players
Dundalk F.C. players
Celtic F.C. players
Greenock Morton F.C. players
Shelbourne F.C. players
Glentoran F.C. players
NIFL Premiership players
Republic of Ireland association footballers
Republic of Ireland international footballers
Living people
Scottish Football League players
Association football inside forwards
1939 births